Gökpınar can refer to:

 Gökpınar, Tercan
 Gökpınar Dam
 Gökpınar, Taşova
 Gökpınar, Bayburt
 Gökpınar, Bolu
 Gökpınar, Elmalı
 Gökpınar, Bilecik
 Gökpınar, Ulus